Mississippi Township is an inactive township in Mississippi County, in the U.S. state of Missouri.

Mississippi Township was established in 1845, taking its name from the Mississippi River.

References

Townships in Missouri
Townships in Mississippi County, Missouri